Douglas Walton (1945 – 25 May 2012) was an English professional rugby league footballer who played in the 1960s and 1970s.

Playing career

International honours
Doug Walton won a cap for Great Britain while at Castleford playing  in the 17-7 victory over France at Station Road, Swinton on Saturday 23 January 1965.

County honours
Walton won a cap for Yorkshire while at Castleford playing left-, i.e. number 8, in the 17-23 defeat by Lancashire at Widnes stadium on Wednesday 24 January 1968.

County League appearances
Walton played in Castleford's victory in the Yorkshire County League during the 1964–65 season.

BBC2 Floodlit Trophy Final appearances
Walton played right-, i.e. number 10, in Castleford's 8-5 victory over Leigh in the 1967 BBC2 Floodlit Trophy Final during the 1967–68 season at Headingley Rugby Stadium, Leeds on Saturday 16 January 1968.

Club career
An offer of £13,000 by Wigan in the mid-1960s for Doug Walton was rejected by Castleford (based on increases in average earnings, this would be approximately £427,900 in 2013), subsequently a serious knee injury halted his progress and limited the number of his appearances.

References

External links
!Great Britain Statistics at englandrl.co.uk (statistics currently missing due to not having appeared for both Great Britain, and England)

(archived by web.archive.org) Minutes silence on Sunday for Dougie Walton

1945 births
2012 deaths
Place of birth missing
Castleford Tigers players
English rugby league players
Great Britain national rugby league team players
Rugby league locks
Rugby league props
Yorkshire rugby league team players